Bismuth(III) fluoride or bismuth trifluoride is a chemical compound of bismuth and fluorine. The chemical formula is BiF3. It is a grey-white powder melting at 649 °C.

It occurs in nature as the rare mineral gananite.

Synthesis
Bismuth fluoride can be prepared by reacting bismuth(III) oxide with hydrofluoric acid:

Bi2O3 + 6 HF → 2 BiF3  + 3 H2O

Structure
α-BiF3 has a cubic crystalline structure (Pearson symbol cF16, space group Fm-3m, No. 225). BiF3 is the prototype for the D03 structure, which is adopted by several intermetallics, including Mg3Pr, Cu3Sb, Fe3Si,  and AlFe3, as well as by the hydride LaH3.0. The unit cell is face-centered cubic with Bi at the face centers and vertices, and F at the octahedral site (mid-edges, center), and tetrahedral sites (centers of the 8 sub cubes) - thus the primitive cell contains 4 Bi and 12 F. Alternatively, with the unit cell shifted (1/4,1/4,1/4) the description can be of a fcc cell with face, edge, corner, and centers filled with F, and half (4 of) the octant centers with F, the other half with Bi (each octant type tetrahedrally arranged). The edge length of the BiF3 cell is 0.5853 nm.

β-BiF3 has the YF3 structure where the bismuth atom has distorted 9 coordination, tricapped trigonal prism. This structure is generally considered to be ionic, and contrasts with fluorides of the lighter members of group 15, phosphorus trifluoride, PF3, arsenic trifluoride, AsF3 and antimony trifluoride, SbF3, where MX3 molecular units are present in the solid.

Reactions
BiF3 is unaffected by water and is almost insoluble. It does not form complexes readily but the following,  BiF3.3HF and BiF4− in NH4BiF4, are known. The addition compound H3BiF6 is hydrolysed by water forming BiOF.

Uses 
BiF3 has received research attention as a possible electrode material for lithium batteries and as a luminescence host material for lanthanum-doped phosphors.

References

Bismuth compounds
Fluorides
Metal halides